Charles Abrams (September 20, 1901 – February 22, 1970) was a Polish-born American lawyer, writer, urbanist, and housing expert who created the New York City Housing and Development Administration in the 1960s. He was one of the first to use the expression "Socialism for the rich and capitalism for the poor."

Abrams had multiple roles as a lawyer, public official, activist, author, and teacher. He greatly influenced public housing and urban studies in the United States and Western Europe. He coauthored the New York Municipal Housing Authorities Law in 1933. In 1936 he successfully argued before the US Supreme Court the case New York City Housing Authority v. Muller. It established the Authority's right to employ the power of eminent domain to clear slums and build public housing. The decision gave a broader meaning to the term public use and represented a victory for Abrams, the Authority's first counsel.

He held teaching positions at various universities and passionately supported public housing and homeownership for the poor while criticizing discrimination and the "business welfare state." Abrams wrote seven books  that reached a wide popular audience to explain housing needs and policies. He participated in more than 20 overseas missions to help establish housing authorities and planning schools around the world.

From 1955 to 1959, Abrams served as head of the New York State Commission Against Discrimination, afterwards serving as president of the National Committee Against Discrimination in Housing from 1961 to 1965.

Works
Revolution in Land, Harper & Brothers, 1939; Arno Press, 1979, 
A housing program for America, League for Industrial Democracy, 1947
Forbidden Neighbors: a Study of Prejudice in Housing, Associated Faculty Press, 1955, 
The city is the frontier, Harper & Row, 1965
Man's Struggle for Shelter: In an Urbanizing World, Mit Press, 1966, 
 The language of cities; a glossary of terms, Volume 14, Viking Press, 1971

See also
 New York City Housing Authority
Socialism for the rich and capitalism for the poor

References

Further reading
 Henderson, A. Scott. Housing and the democratic ideal: the life and thought of Charles Abrams (Columbia University Press, 2000).

1901 births
1970 deaths
Polish emigrants to the United States
American urban planners
MIT School of Architecture and Planning faculty